Arnaud Clément and Michaël Llodra were the defending champion, but lost in the final 6–2, 4–6, [5–10], against Colin Fleming and Ken Skupski.

Seeds

Draw

Draw

External links
 Main Draw

Doubles